Astronomy education or astronomy education research (AER) refers both to the methods currently used to teach the science of astronomy and to an area of pedagogical research that seeks to improve those methods. Specifically, AER includes systematic techniques honed in science and physics education to understand what and how students learn about astronomy and determine how teachers can create more effective learning environments. 

Education is important to astronomy as it impacts both the recruitment of future astronomers and the appreciation of astronomy by citizens and politicians who support astronomical research. Astronomy has been taught throughout much of recorded human history, and has practical application in timekeeping and navigation. Teaching astronomy contributes to an understanding of physics and the origin of the world around us, a shared cultural background, and a sense of wonder and exploration. It includes education of the general public through planetariums, books, and instructive presentations, plus programs and tools for amateur astronomy, and University-level degree programs for professional astronomers. Astronomy organizations provide educational functions and societies in about 100 nation states around the world.

In schools, particularly at the collegiate level, astronomy is aligned with physics and the two are often combined to form a Department of Physics and Astronomy. Some parts of astronomy education overlap with physics education, however, astronomy education has its own arenas, practitioners, journals, and research. This can be demonstrated in the identified 20-year lag between the emergence of AER and physics education research. The body of research in this field are available through electronic sources such as the Searchable Annotated Bibliography of Education Research (SABER) and the American Astronomical Society's database of the contents of their journal "Astronomy Education Review" (see link below).  

The National Aeronautics and Space Administration (NASA) has also created a Center for Astronomy Education, a program designed to support the professional development of astronomy instructors through the NASA JPL Exoplanet Exploration Public Engagement Program and the Spitzer Education and Outreach Program.

See also

European Association for Astronomy Education
Universe Awareness
Astronomical Society of the Pacific

References

External links
Homepage of IAU Commission 46 on Astronomy Education
Astronomy Education Resources at the Astronomical Society of the Pacific
Resource Guides for Astronomy Education
Subject Index to the journal "Astronomy Education Review"
iSTAR ''i''nternational Studies of Astronomy education Research Database of Articles, Theses, & Dissertations